Jamie Bloem (born 26 May 1971) is a former dual code rugby player and rugby league referee. He currently coaches amateur rugby league side Elland ARLFC. He is a former rugby league and rugby union footballer who played in the 1990s and 2000s, and coached in the 2000s and 2010s. As of 2012, he runs a landscape gardening business in Halifax, West Yorkshire.

Background
Bloem was born in Melbourne, Victoria, Australia. He is of Scottish and South African descent.

Rugby league

Club career
Bloem initially played his club rugby league for the Cape Town Coasters in South Africa, he also played in France and has travelled extensively as a player, he became player-coach at Stainland Stags ARLFC (Halifax, West Yorkshire) during the Pennine League 2010–11 season.

Drugs ban
In November 1994, Bloem was the first rugby league player to test positive for performance enhancing anabolic steroid nandrolone, he was banned for two years.

Representative career
Bloem was the captain of South Africa (RL) during the 2000 World Cup, he was eligible for Scotland (RL) through his mother's nationality.

Rugby union
Bloem has also had spells with rugby union sides; Halifax RUFC, Thornensians RUFC (Thorne, Doncaster), and Old Brodleians RUFC (Hipperholme, Halifax, West Yorkshire), whom he took to their first promotion in 75 years, he transferred to Old Rishworthians RUFC (Rishworth, Halifax, West Yorkshire) as player-coach for the 2007–08 season, he was the top point scorer for Old Rishworthians in 2007–08, breaking the club record with 375 points in the season, he became player-coach at Halifax Vandals RUFC at the start of the 2013–2014 season.

Later years
Bloem became a BBC radio rugby league sports summariser, and a rugby league referee and controlled the Nordic Cup match between Norway and Sweden at Partille Ground (Spartacus Rugby Club), Gothenburg on Saturday 30 October 2010.

Wrongly accused
Jamie Bloem was wrongly accused of having sex with a minor, the charge was found to be completely without foundation.

References

External links

1971 births
Living people
Afrikaner people
Australian emigrants to England
Australian people of Dutch descent
Australian people of Scottish descent
Australian people of South African descent
Australian rugby league commentators
Australian rugby league players
Australian rugby league referees
Australian sportspeople in doping cases
Castleford Tigers players
Doncaster R.L.F.C. players
Doping cases in rugby league
Footballers who switched code
Halifax R.L.F.C. players
Huddersfield Giants players
Oldham R.L.F.C. players
Rugby league centres
Rugby league fullbacks
Rugby league halfbacks
Rugby league locks
Rugby league players from Melbourne
Rugby league second-rows
Rugby league wingers
Scotland national rugby league team players
South Africa national rugby league team captains
South Africa national rugby league team players
South African emigrants to the United Kingdom
South African people of Dutch descent
South African rugby league players
South African rugby league referees
South African sportspeople in doping cases
Widnes Vikings players